Phoxinus keumkang is a species of freshwater fish in the family Cyprinidae. It is endemic to South Korea.

References

Phoxinus
Fish described in 1977